Jet ski competition at the 2014 Asian Beach Games was held in Phuket, Thailand from 17 to 19 November 2014 at Patong Beach, Phuket.

Medalists

Medal table

Results

Runabout open 

18 November

Runabout stock

17 November

Runabout 1000 superstock

17 November

Runabout endurance open
19 November

Ski open
17 November

Sport GP
18 November

References

External links 
 

2014 Asian Beach Games events